The 2021 Petit Le Mans (known as the 2021 MOTUL Petit Le Mans for sponsorship reasons) was the 24th running of the Petit Le Mans, and was held on November 13, 2021. It was the 12th and final race in the 2021 IMSA SportsCar Championship, and the 4th race of the 2021 Michelin Endurance Cup. The race was be held at Road Atlanta in Braselton, Georgia. This race was the last ever race for the GTLM Class.

Background
The 2021 running marks the event's return to the final calendar spot on the schedule following the wholesale schedule changes that resulted from the COVID-19 pandemic in 2020. The 2021 edition underwent a date change of its own, being postponed from its traditional early-October spot to the weekend of November 13th. The event featured support from four of IMSA's supporting series; the Michelin Pilot Challenge, IMSA Prototype Challenge, Porsche Carrera Cup North America, and Mazda MX-5 Cup.

On November 3, 2021, IMSA released the latest technical bulletin outlining Balance of Performance for the event. In GTLM, the Chevrolet Corvette C8.R received a one-liter reduction in fuel capacity, while in GTD the 2021 debut of the McLaren required its addition to the BoP table.

This would be the final race for entry Mazda Motorsports as Mazda was stepping back from all racing activities following the 2021 season with the exception of the Mazda MX-5 Cup. Also making its farewell was the GTLM class which in 2022 would be replaced by the new GTD Pro class.

Entries

A total of 43 cars took part in the event, split across five classes. 7 were entered in DPi, 5 in LMP2, 10 in LMP3, 6 in GTLM, and 15 in GTD.

In DPi, the expected addition of the Endurance Cup effort from Ally Cadillac Racing was present, while Hélio Castroneves replaced Olivier Pla as Meyer Shank Racing's third driver. In LMP2, United Autosports returned to complete their scheduled Endurance Cup campaign. In GTLM  the pair of BMW Team RLL M8s returned for the Endurance Cup, WeatherTech Racing also added a second entry, which alongside its own full time entry and the two Corvettes boosted the class to six entries for its last ever race. LMP3 saw its largest grid of the season with ten cars, which included a series debut for FastMD Racing. Returns for United Autosports, Forty7 Motorsports, Jr III Racing (whose lineup included former IndyCar driver Spencer Pigot), and WIN Autosport helped to boost the class to its record-breaking entry number. GTD also featured a number of changes, including the first appearance of the season for the McLaren 720S GT3, fielded by Inception Racing. NTE Sport and Gilbert/Korthoff Motorsports also returned as part of their selective 2021 calendars, as did Alegra Motorsports, who added Mercedes-AMG factor driver Daniel Juncadella to their lineup. Winward Racing also returned for the first time since their class victory at the 24 Hours of Daytona, while the Heart of Racing Team dropped their second entry.

Just hours before the race, Earl Bamber stepped in for Kevin Magnussen in Chip Ganassi Racing's DPi-class entry after Magnussen fell ill.

Qualifying

Qualifying results

Race

Results
Class winners denoted in bold and with

References

External links

Petit Le Mans
2021 WeatherTech SportsCar Championship season
2021 in sports in Georgia (U.S. state)
Petit Le Mans